Lucky 7 is the seventh studio album by hip hop record producer Statik Selektah. The album was released on July 7, 2015, by Duck Down Music Inc. and Showoff Records. The album features guest appearances from Rapsody, Action Bronson, Joey Badass, Your Old Droog, Chauncy Sherod, Dave East, Big K.R.I.T., Royce Da 5'9", Mick Jenkins, Smif-n-Wessun, Young M.A, Buckshot, Illa Ghee, Sean Price, Lil' Fame, Bodega Bamz, Skyzoo, Ea$y Money, Domo Genesis, Masspike Miles, Termanology, Bun B, Styles P, A$AP Twelvyy, Kirk Knight, Wais P, Jared Evan, Ab-Soul, Elle Varner, CJ Fly, Talib Kweli and Cane.

Critical reception

Lucky 7 received generally positive reviews from music critics. At Metacritic, which assigns a normalized rating out of 100 to reviews from mainstream critics, the album received an average score of 69 based on 6 reviews, which indicates "generally favorable reviews". Del F. Cowie of Exclaim! said, "Lucky 7 is at its best when Statik Selektah delves deep into his jazzier side as a producer, as tracks like "Beautiful Life" and "All I Need" affirm." Homer Johnsen of HipHopDX said, "If Lucky 7 truly is the end of a particular era and sound, Statik Selektah undoubtedly goes out in spectacular fashion. The beats are on point and each guest is on top of their game; no one disappoints. Lucky 7 doesn’t deviate from the framework of Statik’s previous compilations, but it does highlight his masterful command of each individual track, without ever simplifying the approach or integrity of the album." Jay Balfour of Pitchfork Media stated, "As a whole Lucky 7 sounds a lot like everything else Statik Selektah has done up to this point; the album is neither offputting nor particularly exciting, and it's hard to feel strongly about at all. A couple of the songs sound good enough to have just gotten cut from better solo albums, but that's not a strong selling point."

Track listing
All tracks produced by Statik Selektah.

Charts

References

2015 albums
Statik Selektah albums
Albums produced by Statik Selektah